Dichomeris opsorrhoa is a moth in the family Gelechiidae. It was described by Edward Meyrick in 1929. It is found in South Africa.

The wingspan is 15–16 mm. The forewings are rather dark fuscous with a brownish-ochreous streak beneath the costa from the base to about one-third, and a short streak on the base of the dorsum joining this at the origin. The stigmata are cloudy, dark fuscous, with the plical beneath the first discal, and some ochreous suffusion on the sides of these, and a streak joining the discal. There is an ochreous transverse shade at three-fourths, angulated in the middle. There is also some ochreous irroration or suffusion posteriorly, especially towards the three or four dark terminal dots. The hindwings are rather dark grey.

References

Endemic moths of South Africa
Moths described in 1929
instans